Abdul Rahman Kamara (born October 27, 1989, in Freetown, Sierra Leone) is a Sierra Leonean footballer.

Career
Kamara is commonly known by his  nickname Police.

Kallon F.C.
Kamara played on Sierra Leone National Premier League side Kallon F.C. five seasons until 2008.

Dynamo Pervolia
Dynamo Pervolia signed Kamara 2008 and he played there 2 seasons.

Enosis Neon Paralimni FC
Kamara signed a new contract with Enosis Neon Paralimni FC on August 25, 2010.

ASIL Lysi
ASIL Lysi has signed Kamara on a three-year lucrative contract on July 22, 2011, at the Grigoris Afxentiou stadium in Larnaca, Cyprus.

International career
Kamara represented Sierra Leone as part of the U-17, U-20 and U-23 National Teams. Before his senior team debut he has represented Sierra Leone in junior competition in the 2005 Meridian Cup taking Spain, Turkey, France and Portugal. After this he won three trophy’s, helped FC Kallon to eliminate Nigeria champions Ocean Boys in 2007, but went out of the competition by the present Ivorian champions Asec Mimosas, was part of the FC Kallon squad that played under 19 competitions in Italy and France the same year.

Honours

Club
Kallon F.C.
Sierra Leonean FA Cup
Sierra Leone Champions 2006

External links
Asil unveils Kamara, Sierra Express Media 2011-07-25
Five foreign based in Salone U-23 squad, Sierra Express Media 2010-12-15
2012 London Olympics qualifier …Rahman jets in on Tuesday, Sierra Express Media 2010-12-09
Kamara opted to break into squad, Sierra Express Media 2010-09-30

1989 births
Living people
Sierra Leonean footballers
F.C. Kallon players
Sierra Leonean expatriates in the United States
ASIL Lysi players
Association football midfielders
Sportspeople from Freetown